Telecommunications in Spain is accomplished through the transmission of information by various types of technologies within Spain.

Telephones (landline and cellular)
Telephones - main lines in use: 18.583 million (2007)
 Telephones - mobile cellular: 48.8 million (2007)
Telephone system: generally adequate, modern facilities
domestic: NA
international: 22 coaxial submarine cables; satellite earth stations - 2 Intelsat (1 Atlantic Ocean and 1 Indian Ocean), NA Eutelsat; tropospheric scatter to adjacent countries

Radio
Radio broadcast stations: AM 208, FM 715, shortwave 1 (1998)
Radios: 13.1 million (1997)

Television
Television broadcast stations: 228 (plus 2,112 repeaters); note - these figures include 11 television broadcast stations and 89 repeaters in the Canary Islands (September 1995)
Televisions: 16.2 million (1997)

Internet
Internet service providers (ISPs): 49 (1999)
Internet hosts: 3,264 million (2008)
Internet users: 33.7 million (2012)
Country code (Top-level domain): ES

See also 
 History of telecommunication
 Internet in Spain
 Media of Spain
 Television in Spain
 Radio in Spain
 Newspapers in Spain
 Outline of telecommunication
 Telefónica

References